Rodolfo Arena (15 December 1910 – 31 August 1980) was a Brazilian actor. He appeared in 90 films between 1920 and 1980. He starred in the 1974 film Sagarana: The Duel, which was entered into the 24th Berlin International Film Festival.

Selected filmography
 O Crime de Cravinhos (1920)
 Killed the Family and Went to the Movies (1969)
 Brazil Year 2000 (1969)
 In the Family (1971)
 Sagarana: The Duel (1974)
 Xica da Silva (1976)
 The Last Plantation (1976)
 A Summer Rain (1978)
 Bye Bye Brasil (1979)

References

External links

1910 births
1980 deaths
People from Araraquara
Brazilian male film actors
20th-century Brazilian male actors